General Brennan may refer to:

John W. Brennan (fl. 2010s–2020s), U.S. Army major general
Kieran Brennan (born 1957), Irish Army major general
Michael Brennan (Lieutenant-General) (1896–1986), Irish Defence Forces general

See also
John Milton Brannan (1819−1882), Union Army brigadier general